Modti Inc. is a Finnish technology company headquartered in Joensuu, Finland, that designs, develops, and sells its shape programmable hardware technology. As of May 17, 2015, its main product is Segment, an electrically driven, paper-thin, and flexible actuator bending mechanism tailored for use in emerging flexible technologies.

Modti was officially founded by Shane H. Allen and Iouri Kotorov on August 13, 2013, to develop and sell its shape programmable hardware technology. Originally registered as MottiFilm Inc. and was renamed Modti Inc. on August 13, 2014, due to its name giving the incorrect impression of being a movie company.

Partners have included Joensuu Business Incubator, Karelia University of Applied Sciences, Startup Sauna, FAU Technology Business Incubator and Joensuu Entrepreneurship Society.

Investments/funds
 2013 DRAFT Karelia, Finland
 2014 Ari Lahti, Finland
 2014 TEKES Finnish Government Grant, Finland
 2015 Kima Ventures, France
 2015 ViaGroup, France
 2015 HTOL/Rémi Toledano, France

Awards
 2015 Top 5 Most Innovative Startups in Europe - Vienna Business Agency and Pioneers Festival - Vienna Startup Welcome Package
 1st Place - 2014 PitchMeUp Pitching Competition - Shane H. Allen
 2013 StartMeUp Business Idea Competition - North Karelia Enterprise Agency Special Award (Uusyrityskeskuksen Erikoispalkinto)
 2013 StartMeUp Business Idea Competition - Best Student Idea Award (Paras Opiskelijaidea)
 2013 StartMeUp Business Idea Competition - Best Technology and Materials, Expert Award (Teknologia ja Materiaalit, Asiantuntijapalveluita)
 1st Place - 2013 PitchMeUp Pitching Competition - Shane H. Allen

References

External links
Official website
Materials science organizations
Consumer electronics brands
Technology companies of Finland
Joensuu